Rubenow is a municipality in the Vorpommern-Greifswald district, in Mecklenburg-Vorpommern, Germany. It consists of

Rubenow
Rubenow-Siedlung
Groß Ernsthof
Latzow
Nieder-Voddow
Nonnendorf
Voddow

References

Vorpommern-Greifswald